Popular tourist attractions in Malaysia include the following:

Attractions

Beaches
 Batu Ferringhi
 Port Dickson

Historical structures and buildings
 A Famosa
 Christ Church Malacca
 Church of the Immaculate Conception
 Stadthuys
 Sultan Abdul Samad Building

Hill stations

Islands
 Besar
 Langkawi
 Pangkor
 Tioman

Nature
 Bario
 Cameron Highlands
 Endau-Rompin National Park
 Kenyir Lake
 Long Pasia
 Tempurung Cave

Resorts
 Bukit Tinggi
 Genting Highlands
Datai

Shopping districts
 Bukit Bintang
 Gurney Drive
 Petaling Street

Skyscrapers
 Merdeka 118
 Petronas Twin Towers
 The Exchange 106
 KOMTAR Penang

Towers
 Kuala Lumpur Tower
 Kuantan 188
 Alor Setar Tower
 MAHA Tower Langkawi
 Taming Sari Tower
 Leaning Tower of Teluk Intan

Sports
 Johor Circuit
 National Sports Complex
 Sepang International Circuit

Theme parks
 A' Famosa Resort
 Berjaya Times Square Theme Park
 Legoland Malaysia Resort
 Melaka Wonderland
 Sunway Lagoon
 Tropical Village
 Movie Animation Park Studios

Transportations
 Awana Skyway
 Genting Skyway
 Langkawi Cable Car
 Penang Hill Railway

Zoos 
 Johor Zoo, Johor
 Melaka Zoo, Melaka
 National Zoo, Selangor 
 Taiping Zoo, Perak

Bird Parks 
 Kuala Lumpur Bird Park

List of tourist attractions by states or federal territories
 List of tourist attractions in Kuala Lumpur
 List of tourist attractions in Penang
 List of tourist attractions in Malacca
 List of tourist attractions in Selangor
 List of tourist attractions in Pahang
 List of tourist attractions in Perak
 List of tourist attractions in Sabah
 List of tourist attractions in Kelantan
 List of tourist attractions in Kedah
 List of tourist attractions in Negeri Sembilan
 List of tourist attractions in Terengganu
 List of tourist attractions in Johor

See also
 Tourism in Malaysia

References

Tourism in Malaysia